Nitrogen trifluoride is an inorganic, colorless, non-flammable, toxic gas with a slightly musty odor.  It finds increasing use within the manufacturing of flat-panel displays, photovoltaics, LEDs and other microelectronics.  Nitrogen trifluoride is also an extremely strong and long-lived greenhouse gas.  Its atmospheric burden exceeded 2 parts per trillion during 2019 and has doubled every five years since the late 20th century.

Synthesis and reactivity
Nitrogen trifluoride did not exist in significant quantities on Earth prior to its synthesis by humans.  It is a rare example of a binary fluoride that can be prepared directly from the elements only at very uncommon conditions, such as an electric discharge. After first attempting the synthesis in 1903, Otto Ruff prepared nitrogen trifluoride by the electrolysis of a molten mixture of ammonium fluoride and hydrogen fluoride. It proved to be far less reactive than the other nitrogen trihalides nitrogen trichloride, nitrogen tribromide and nitrogen triiodide, all of which are explosive. Alone among the nitrogen trihalides it has a negative enthalpy of formation. It is prepared in modern times both by direct reaction of ammonia and fluorine and by a variation of Ruff's method. It is supplied in pressurized cylinders.

 is slightly soluble in water without undergoing chemical reaction. It is nonbasic with a low dipole moment of 0.2340 D. By contrast, ammonia is basic and highly polar (1.47 D).  This difference arises from the fluorine atoms acting as electron withdrawing groups, attracting essentially all of the lone pair electrons on the nitrogen atom. NF3 is a potent yet sluggish oxidizer.

It oxidizes hydrogen chloride to chlorine:
2 NF3 + 6 HCl → 6 HF + N2 + 3 Cl2

It is compatible with steel and Monel, as well as several plastics.
It converts to tetrafluorohydrazine upon contact with metals, but only at high temperatures:
2 NF3 + Cu → N2F4 + CuF2
NF3 reacts with fluorine and antimony pentafluoride to give the tetrafluoroammonium salt:
 NF3 + F2 + SbF5 → NFSbF

Mixtures of NF3 and B2H6 are explosive even at cryogenic temperatures, reacting to produce nitrogen gas, boron trifluoride, and hydrofluoric acid.

Applications

Etching 

Nitrogen trifluoride is primarily used to remove silicon and silicon-compounds during the manufacturing of semiconductor devices such as LCD displays, some thin-film solar cells, and other microelectronics.  In these applications  is initially broken down within a plasma. The resulting fluorine radicals are the active agents that attack polysilicon, silicon nitride and silicon oxide.  They can be used as well to remove tungsten silicide, tungsten, and certain other metals.  In addition to serving as an etchant in device fabrication,  is also widely used to clean PECVD chambers.

 dissociates more readily within a low-pressure discharge in comparison to perfluorinated compounds (PFCs) and sulfur hexafluoride. The greater abundance of negatively-charged free radicals thus generated can yield higher silicon removal rates,  and provide other process benefits such as less residual contamination and a lower net charge stress on the device being fabricated.

The utilization efficiency of the chemicals applied in plasma processes varies widely between equipment and applications.  A sizeable fraction of the reactants are wasted into the exhaust stream and can ultimately be emitted into Earth's atmosphere.  Modern abatement systems can substantially decrease atmospheric emissions.   has not been subject to significant use restrictions.  The annual reporting of  production, consumption, and waste emissions by large manufacturers has been required in many industrialized countries as a response to the observed atmospheric growth and the international Kyoto Protocol.

Highly toxic fluorine gas (F2, diatomic fluorine) is a climate neutral replacement for nitrogen trifluoride in some manufacturing applications.  It requires more stringent handling and safety precautions, especially to protect manufacturing personnel.

Nitrogen trifluoride is also used in hydrogen fluoride and deuterium fluoride lasers, which are types of chemical lasers. There it is also preferred to fluorine gas due to its more convenient handling properties

Greenhouse gas

 is a greenhouse gas, with a global warming potential (GWP) 17,200 times greater than that of  when compared over a 100-year period. It has an estimated atmospheric lifetime of 740 years, although other work suggests a slightly shorter lifetime of 550 years (and a corresponding GWP of 16,800).

Although  has a high GWP, for a long time its radiative forcing in the Earth's atmosphere has been assumed to be small, spuriously presuming that only small quantities are released into the atmosphere. Research has questioned the previous assumptions. High-volume applications such as DRAM computer memory production, the manufacturing of flat panel displays and the large-scale production of thin-film solar cells use .

Since 1992, when less than 100 tons were produced, production has grown to an estimated 4000 tons in 2007 and is projected to increase significantly. World production of NF3 is expected to reach 8000 tons a year by 2010. An estimated 2% of produced  is released into the atmosphere. Robson projected that the maximum atmospheric concentration is less than 0.16 parts per trillion (ppt) by volume, which will provide less than 0.001 Wm−2 of IR forcing.
The mean global tropospheric concentration of NF3 has risen from about 0.02 ppt (parts per trillion, dry air mole fraction) in 1980, to 0.86 ppt in 2011, with a rate of increase of 0.095 ppt yr−1, or about 11% per year, and an interhemispheric gradient that is consistent with emissions occurring overwhelmingly in the Northern Hemisphere, as expected. This rise rate in 2011 corresponds to about 1200 metric tons/y NF3 emissions globally, or about 10% of the NF3 global production estimates. This is a significantly higher percentage than has been estimated by industry, and thus strengthens the case for inventorying NF3 production and for regulating its emissions.
One study co-authored by industry representatives suggests that the contribution of the NF3 emissions to the overall greenhouse gas budget of thin-film Si-solar cell manufacturing is clear.

The UNFCCC, within the context of the Kyoto Protocol, decided to include nitrogen trifluoride in the second Kyoto Protocol compliance period, which begins in 2012 and ends in either 2017 or 2020. Following suit, the WBCSD/WRI GHG Protocol is amending all of its standards (corporate, product and Scope 3) to also cover NF3.

Safety
It is a pulmonary irritant with a toxicity considerably lower than nitrogen oxides, and overexposure via inhalation causes the conversion of hemoglobin in blood to methemoglobin, which can lead to the condition methemoglobinemia. The National Institute for Occupational Safety and Health (NIOSH) specifies that the concentration that is immediately dangerous to life or health (IDLH value) is 1,000 ppm.

See also
IPCC list of greenhouse gases
Nitrogen pentafluoride
Tetrafluorohydrazine

Notes

References

External links
 
 NF3 Code of Practice (European Industrial Gas Association)]
 WebBook page for NF3
 CDC - NIOSH Pocket Guide to Chemical Hazards

Inorganic amines
Nitrogen fluorides
Greenhouse gases
Industrial gases
Nitrogen(III) compounds